Hongqi (Chinese for "Red Flag") may refer to:

Hongqi (magazine), published by the Chinese Communist Party from 1958 to 1988
Hongqi (automobile), luxury car series of First Automobile Works (FAW), Changchun, Jilin, China
Hongqi Press, a book publisher of China

Places in China
Hongqi District, Xinxiang, Henan
Hongqi, Tibet, name of many settlements in Tibet

Community
Hongqi, Zhucheng, Zhucheng Subdistrict, Xinzhou District, Wuhan, Hubei

Subdistricts
Hongqi Subdistrict, Maoming, in Maonan District, Maoming, Guangdong
Hongqi Subdistrict, Hegang, in Gongnong District, Hegang, Heilongjiang
Hongqi Subdistrict, Jiagedaqi District, in Jiagedaqi District, Da Hinggan Ling Prefecture, Heilongjiang
Hongqi Subdistrict, Shuangyashan, in Baoshan District, Shuangyashan, Heilongjiang
Hongqi Subdistrict, Xiangfang, in Xiangfang District, Heilongjiang
Hongqi Subdistrict, Hebi, in Shancheng District, Hebi, Henan
Hongqi Subdistrict, Wuhan, in Hongshan District, Wuhan, Hubei
Hongqi Subdistrict, Xiangtan (红旗街道), a subdistrict of Yuetang District in Xiangtan City, Hunan Province.
Hongqi Subdistrict, Baishan, in Hunjiang District, Baishan, Jilin
Hongqi Subdistrict, Changchun, in Chaoyang District, Changchun, Jilin
Hongqi Subdistrict, Jilin City, in Fengman District, Jilin City, Jilin
Hongqi Subdistrict, Chaoyang, Liaoning, in Shuangta District, Chaoyang, Liaoning
Hongqi Subdistrict, Dalian, in Ganjingzi District, Dalian, Liaoning
Hongqi Subdistrict, Panjin, in Shuangtaizi District, Panjin, Liaoning
Hongqi Subdistrict, Qinghe District, Tieling, in Qinghe District, Tieling, Liaoning
Hongqi Subdistrict, Yinzhou District, Tieling, in Yinzhou District, Tieling, Liaoning
Hongqi Subdistrict, Xi'an, in Baqiao District, Xi'an, Shaanxi

Towns
Hongqi, Zhuhai, in Jinwan District, Zhuhai, Guangdong
Hongqi, Haikou, in Qiongshan District, Haikou, Hainan
Hongqi, Luanping County, Hebei
Hongqi, Qitaihe, in Xinxing District, Qitaihe, Heilongjiang
Hongqi, Lindian County, Heilongjiang
Hongqi, Taibus Banner, Xilin Gol League, Inner Mongolia
Hongqi, Fengcheng, Liaoning
Hongqi, Yingkou, in Bayuquan District, Yingkou, Liaoning
Hongqi Town, Xayar County, Aksu Prefecture, Xinjiang

Townships
Hongqi Township, Guanyang County, in Guangxi
Hongqi Township, Jixi, in Hengshan District, Jixi, Heilongjiang
Hongqi Township, Hegang, in Dongshan District, Hegang, Heilongjiang
Hongqi Township, Sunwu County, Heilongjiang
Hongqi Township, Xinmin, Liaoning
Hongqi Township, Xayar County, Aksu Prefecture, in Xinjiang
Hongqi Manchu Ethnic Township, Harbin (红旗满族乡), in Nangang District, Harbin, Heilongjiang
Hongqi Manchu Ethnic Township, Wuchang, Heilongjiang (红旗满族乡)

Villages
Hongqi, Jingmen, Yonglong, Jingshan County, Jingmen, Hubei
Hongqi, Renchaoxi, Renchaoxi, Sangzhi County, Zhangjiajie, Hunan

Other uses
Acer Inc., a Taiwanese company whose Chinese name is Hongqi (宏碁)

zh:红旗 (消歧义)